Kelve Fort, or Kelwa Fort, is a fort in the Thane district of Maharashtra, located 12.5 km from Palghar. This fort is amidst the Casuarina plantation on the Kelwa Beach. This fort is in ruined condition. The outer walls, steps, parapets, bastions etc. in solid masonry are in excellent order and worth seeing. The half of the fort is below the sandy beach level. The fort is located in the Mangelwada of Kelve village. There is a small Kelve pankot on the mouth of the Kelve creek.

History
This fort was built by Portuguese. The Portuguese reported that in 1727 there was a garrison of sixty men in the fort out of which seven were white. There were 15 guns of two to ten pounder size but there were no artillerymen. Most of the guns were unserviceable. After the siege of Vasai Fort by Chimaji Appa, the Maratha army captured this fort on 10 January 1739. The fort was captured by British Army in 1818. The half buried fort in the sandy soil was unearthed in 2008–09.

Description
The fort is rectangular in shape. The entrance gate is east facing immediately followed by another gate at a right angle. There are four triangular bastions triangular on the four corners of the fort.

See also
 List of forts in Maharashtra
 List of forts in India
 Chimaji Appa
 Marathi People
 Maratha Navy
 List of Maratha dynasties and states
 Battles involving the Maratha Empire
 Maratha Army
 Maratha titles
 Military history of India
 List of people involved in the Maratha Empire

References

Buildings and structures of the Maratha Empire
Forts in Palghar district
16th-century forts in India
Tourist attractions in Konkan
Former populated places in India